NHJ may refer to:

Nicky Hambleton-Jones (born 1971), television presenter with the personal stylist consultancy NHJ Style
Nikole Hannah-Jones (born 1976), American journalist, professor, and lead author of The 1619 Project
Niels Hansen Jacobsen (1861–1941), Danish sculptor and ceramist
Norra Hälsinglands Järnväg, a Swedish railway from 1896 to 1962
Norsk Hoved-Jernbane class of locomotives in Manning Wardle
NHJ, a Brazilian company that sponsors the Museu da Imagem e do Som do Rio de Janeiro
nhj, a deprecated ISO code for Sierra Puebla Nahuatl